Tecla is a female given name. Notable people with the name include:

 Tecla Insolia (born 2004), Italian actress and singer
 Tecla Marinescu (born 1960), Romanian sprint canoer
 Tecla Namachanja Wanjala (born 1962), Kenyan peace activist
 Tecla Pettenuzzo (born 1999), Italian footballer
 Tecla San Andres Ziga (1906–1992), Filipina senator
 Tecla Scarano (1894–1978), Italian actress and singer
 Tecla Tofano (1927–1995), Venezuelan artist
 Tecla Tum, Kenyan politician
 Tecla Vigna (died 1927), Italian-American opera singer and teacher

See also
 Tecla house
 Tekla (given name)
 Thecla (disambiguation)
 Thekla (disambiguation)